Wei Qiuxiang (born 15 February 1986) is a Chinese handball player. She has played on the Chinese national team, competed at the 2008 Summer Olympics in Beijing, where China placed sixth, and participated at the 2011 World Women's Handball Championship in Brazil.

References

External links

1986 births
Living people
Chinese female handball players
Olympic handball players of China
Handball players at the 2008 Summer Olympics
Sportspeople from Guangxi
People from Liuzhou
Asian Games medalists in handball
Handball players at the 2010 Asian Games
Asian Games gold medalists for China
Medalists at the 2010 Asian Games
21st-century Chinese women